Sandals Resorts is a Jamaican operator of all-inclusive resorts for couples in the Caribbean. It is a part of Sandals Resorts International (SRI), the parent company of Sandals Resorts, Beaches Resorts, Fowl Cay Resort, and several private villas. Founded by Jamaican-born entrepreneur Gordon "Butch" Stewart in 1981, SRI is based in Montego Bay, Jamaica and is responsible for resort development, service standards, training, and day-to-day operations. Sandals Resorts International has properties throughout the Caribbean islands of Jamaica, Bahamas, Saint Lucia, Antigua, Turks & Caicos, Grenada, Curacao, and St. Vincent with sixteen Sandals Resorts, three Beaches Resorts, one Fowl Cay private island resort, and four villa properties in Jamaica.

Properties

Sandals Resorts properties include: 
 Sandals Montego Bay
 Sandals Royal Caribbean Resort & Private Island
 Sandals Ochi Beach Resort (formerly Sandals Grande Riviera Beach & Villa Golf Resort)
 Sandals Negril Beach Resort & Spa
 Sandals South Coast (formerly Whitehouse European Village & Spa)
 Sandals Royal Plantation Ocho Rios, Jamaica
 Sandals Grande St. Lucian Spa & Beach Resort
 Sandals Regency La Toc Golf Resort & Spa in St. Lucia
 Sandals Halcyon Beach St. Lucia
 Sandals Grande Antigua Resort & Spa
 Sandals Royal Bahamian Spa Resort & Offshore Island
 Sandals Emerald Bay Great Exuma, Bahamas
 Sandals Barbados Resort & Spa
 Sandals Grenada Resort & Spa Grenada
 Sandals Royal Barbados Resort & Spa
 Sandals Royal Curaçao
 Sandals Dunn's River, Ocho Rios, Jamaica 

New resorts:
 In August 2009, SRI announced the purchase of the former Four Season Great Exuma, which debuted as Sandals Emerald Bay, Great Exuma, Bahamas on January 22, 2010.
 In July 2020, SRI announced its entry into St. Vincent and the Grenadines with the acquisition of the former Buccament Bay Resort on the southwest coast of St. Vincent with plans to open as a Beaches Resort. 
 In December 2020 SRI announced the purchase of the former Santa Barbara Beach & Golf Resort on the island of Curaçao with plans to open it as a Sandals Royal Curacao in the 4th Quarter 2022. 
 In May 2021, SRI announced the purchase of three new resorts in Jamaica to become Sandals Dunn's River, Sandals Royal Dunn's River and Beaches Runaway Bay. 
 Sandals officially welcomed its 16th Resort, Sandals Royal Curacao in June of 2022. The property is situated on 44-acres within a 3,000 acre protected preserve.

Leadership

Adam Stewart is the Executive Chairman of Sandals Resorts International (SRI). Adam became Chairman upon the death of his father Gordon "Butch" Stewart, the Chairman and Founder of SRI, on January 4, 2021. 

Gebhard Rainer is the current CEO of Sandals Resorts International.

History
In 1981 Gordon "Butch" Stewart purchased an old hotel (the Bay Roc hotel) on one of Montego Bay's largest beaches, despite having no hotel experience and opened it as Sandals Montego Bay.

As of 2007, Gordon "Butch" Stewart controlled what analysts estimate to be a billion dollar, privately owned Jamaican-based empire that includes 25 Caribbean resorts, Appliance Traders Ltd., and The Observer newspaper.

Adam Stewart is the current Executive Chairman of Sandals Resorts International (SRI), which owns and operates Caribbean-based Sandals Resorts and Beaches Resorts. Stewart oversees all areas of SRI operations, which is headquartered in Montego Bay, Jamaica.  He has held this position since 2021 upon the death of his father Gordon "Butch" Stewart.

Also, in 1984, Sandals launched the Caribbean's first swim-up bar at its Montego Bay Resort in Jamaica.

In March 2009, Stewart launched The Sandals Foundation, the philanthropic arm of Sandals Resorts International.

In August 2009, Adam Stewart was appointed as Deputy Chairman of the family-owned ATL Group comprising the Jamaica Observer and a chain of appliance outlets.

Sandals Corporate University (SCU) - a regional adult education program for the 10,000 employees of Sandals Resorts and Beaches Resorts - was launched in March 2012. Through partnerships with internationally recognized universities, professional organizations, and local education institutions, SCU provides courses on skills such as customer service, leadership, the art of selling, and professional communications.

On December 1, 2016, Sandals opened Caribbean’s first overwater villas, at the Sandals Royal Caribbean in Montego Bay.

In 2021, the resort company celebrated its 40th Anniversary since the opening of its first resort Sandals Montego Bay, in Montego Bay Jamaica.

In 2022, Sandals opened its first resort in the Dutch Caribbean, Sandals Royal Curaçao, in June.

Controversies

Policy on gay couples
Due to the laws in the countries in which they operate, the company had a policy dating from 1981 that could not allow same-sex couples from their "couples-only" resorts. The policy was variously stated by characterizing the accommodations as "resort for couples only." In various Caribbean islands, a couple is defined as one female adult and one male adult", "policies require male/female couples only", or "couples of the same gender are not accepted." This policy received a great deal of publicity when stays at their resorts were offered as prizes in various promotions by companies such as Microsoft, Yahoo!, and US Airways in 1999. Later reports indicated that some resorts also made no accommodations for people with disabilities, prompting the ACLU to opine that companies offering Sandals stays as prizes, or otherwise doing business with Sandals resorts, might be the targets of lawsuits. The companies involved promptly severed their relationships with Sandals, stating they were unaware of its discriminatory practices. Adverts for the company were banned from the London Underground in 2003 after public objections were raised.   One possible cause for this policy may have been that homosexuality was illegal in Jamaica. Sandals ended its policy of refusing service to gay couples in August 2004 after further protest.

Corruption allegation settlement
In January 2013, the government of Turks and Caicos Islands and Sandals agreed to a settlement of US$12 million around local corruption allegations, without admission of any liability.

References

External links

Hospitality companies of Jamaica
Hotels established in 1981
Hotel chains
Hotels in Barbados
Hotels in Jamaica
Hotels in Nassau, Bahamas
Hotels in the Bahamas
Jamaican brands
Tourism in Antigua and Barbuda
Tourism in Grenada
Tourism in Saint Lucia